Radical Socialist Party may refer to:

Estonian Radical Socialist Party
Radical Party (France)
Radical Socialist Party (Luxembourg)
Radical-Socialist Party Camille Pelletan, France
Socialist Radical Party (Chile)
Radical Socialist Republican Party, Spain